is the 13th studio album by Japanese singer/songwriter Yōko Oginome. Released through Victor Entertainment on June 3, 1992, the album was produced by Keisuke Tsukimitsu and features the hit singles "Nee", "Steal Your Love", and a cover of "Coffee Rumba". It also marked Oginome's debut as a songwriter, having written the lyrics to two songs in the album. The album was reissued on May 26, 2010 with four bonus tracks as part of Oginome's 25th anniversary celebration.

The album peaked at No. 3 on Oricon's albums chart, becoming her last top-10 album. It also sold over 165,000 copies.

Track listing 
All tracks are arranged by Yukio Sugai, Kōichi Kaminaga, and Ryujin Inoue, except where indicated.

Personnel
 Hitoshi Takaba – keyboards
 Kōichi Kaminaga – guitar
 Yukio Sugai – bass, drums
 Yumi Murata – backing vocals

Charts

References

External links
 
 
 

1992 albums
Yōko Oginome albums
Japanese-language albums
Victor Entertainment albums